Ha Keng Hau is a village in the Tai Wai area of Sha Tin District, Hong Kong.

Administration
Ha Keng Hau is a recognized village under the New Territories Small House Policy.

Location
Ha Keng Hau, Sheung Keng Hau and Hin Tin are three adjacent villages located along Hin Keng Street, along a northeast–southwest direction. Hin Keng Estate, located northeast of the villages and across Hin Keng Street, was named after them. Ha Keng Hau is located east of Hin Keng Estate and west of Lung Hang Estate.

History
Ha Keng Hau was established by the Law and the Mak during the 18th century. The Mak who settled there had branched out of Pan Chung in Tai Po.

At the time of the 1911 census, the population of Keng Hau was 195. The number of males was 86.

See also
 Hin Keng station
 Kau Yeuk (Sha Tin)
 Keng Hau (constituency)

References

External links

 Delineation of area of existing village Ha Keng Hau (Sha Tin) for election of resident representative (2019 to 2022)

Villages in Sha Tin District, Hong Kong
Tai Wai